Schilleriella is a genus of wasps belonging to the family Encyrtidae.

The species of this genus are found in Australia.

Species:

Schilleriella brevipterus 
Schilleriella pulchra

References

Encyrtidae
Hymenoptera genera